Douigni is a department of Nyanga Province in southern Gabon. The capital lies at Moabi. It had a population of 5,235 in 2013.

Towns and villages

References

Nyanga Province
Departments of Gabon